Clerical Medical is a British life assurance, pensions and investments company founded in 1824, and a subsidiary of Lloyds Banking Group.

History
In 1824, Dr George Pinckard formed a committee of physicians and members of the clergy which published a pamphlet called 'Prospectus for the Establishment of a new Assurance Office with Improved Arrangements'. On 18 June 1824, the Medical, Clerical and General Life Assurance Society was formed.  Pinckard was appointed as Chairman, the Marquis of Huntly as President, and Pinckard's brother Joseph as Resident Secretary and Actuary. A board of directors, which included eight eminent physicians was also appointed. The company's first policy was  issued to Richard Pinckard, a nephew of Dr George Pinckard.

In 1855, the company moved its headquarters to Lichfield House in St James's Square, London.

Clerical Medical acquired the General Reversionary and Investment Company in 1913, and in 1920 a merger with The Employers’ Liability Assurance Corporation took place. In 1961 by Act of Parliament, Clerical Medical became a mutual office.

In 1975, the company moved its head office from St James's Square, London to Bristol.

Following the decision to demutualise the company in 1995, Clerical Medical merged with the Halifax in 1996, and was later absorbed into HBOS plc in 2001.

HBOS was bought by Lloyds TSB Group in January 2009. The resulting company, Lloyds Banking Group, announced in April 2009 that the Clerical Medical brand would eventually be phased out in favour of its Scottish Widows subsidiary.

In 2015, Lloyds Banking Group sold Clerical Medical International (CMI) to offshore life assurance company RL360°.

Illness and Premium 
In the early 19th century, the following illnesses, lifestyles, injuries, and description of such conditions were recorded and raised the premium for prospective applicants to Clerical Medical, by which the company made profit when clients lived longer than expected.

 "Consumption" (pulmonary tuberculosis)
 Dropsy (oedema)
 "spitting of blood" "vomiting of blood" (lung cancer, pneumonia, tuberculosis)
 "indigestion" "Bilious attacks with spasms" (ulcers, cancer)
 Gout
 Apoplexy "Paralysis and Determination of Blood to the Head"
 Intemperance "drinking ale to excess" "Takes Laudanum"
 "Corpulency" "Fast and short necked" "Lusty and lives rather freely"
 Rupture
 Amputations
 Physical injury "an account of His Grace (Duke of Richmond) to have a Musket Ball lodged in his person from a wound which he received at the Battle of Orthez, and his having, about six or seven years since, been affected with a spitting of blood after being thrown from his Horse when hunting"

References

External links
Official website
 

Lloyds Banking Group
Life insurance companies of the United Kingdom
British companies established in 1824
Financial services companies established in 1824
Companies based in Bristol
1824 establishments in England